Elafos is a village and a community of the Agia municipality. The 2011 census recorded 219 inhabitants in the village. The community of Elafos covers an area of 56.50 km2.

Population
According to the 2011 census, the population of the settlement of Elafos was 219 people, showing no change when compared with the population of the previous census of 2001.

See also
 List of settlements in the Larissa regional unit

References

Populated places in Larissa (regional unit)